Trevor Porteous (9 October 1933 – 15 May 1997) was an English football player and coach.

Career
Born in Hull, Porteous played for Hull City and Stockport County. He was also player-manager of Stockport between 1963 and 1965.

References

1933 births
1997 deaths
English footballers
English football managers
Hull City A.F.C. players
Stockport County F.C. players
English Football League players
Stockport County F.C. managers
Association football wing halves